Peter Ries (also known as Marc Cassandra, Gilbert or Steve Hall) is a German record producer, composer, arranger and remixer.

Ries started his career as a singer in 1980 under the nickname Gilbert. Following collaborations with Sandra and Sally Oldfield, he produced singles with 'N Sync, Kylie Minogue, Love Inc., Eros Ramazzotti, No Angels, Bro'Sis, Joana Zimmer, Thomas Anders, Xavier Naidoo, Kool & the Gang, Mr. President, Enigma and several DSDS candidates including Juliette Schoppmann and Mike Leon Grosch.

Selected production discography

Top ten singles

References

External links

German record producers
German composers
Eurodance musicians
Living people
Year of birth missing (living people)